Coleophora vitilis is a moth of the family Coleophoridae. It is found in Turkestan and Uzbekistan.

The wingspan is 13–15 mm.

The larvae feed on Artemisia juncea. They create a leafy case, consisting of large pieces of leaves arranged alternately on one or the other side giving the impression of a woven case. The pieces used to increase the size of the case are cut from the middle part of the leaf blade. The valve is two-sided. The case has a length of 6.5–8 mm and is chocolate-brown or grayish in color. Larvase can be found in the beginning of June and (after diapause) from the end of April to the beginning of May.

References

vitilis
Moths of Asia
Moths described in 1973